Genota nicklesi is a species of sea snail, a marine gastropod mollusk in the family Borsoniidae.

Description
The shells of most species of sea snails are spirally coiled. The length of the shell varies between 25 mm and 42 mm.

Distribution
This marine species occurs in the Atlantic Ocean off Angola and tropical West Africa

References

External links
 

nicklesi
Gastropods described in 1952